The Dakota Cub Super 18 is an American amateur-built aircraft, designed and produced by Dakota Cub of Sioux Falls, South Dakota. The aircraft is supplied as a kit for amateur construction.

Design and development
The Super 18 is the kit derivative of the type certified Super 18 Model S18-180 that is manufactured by a separate, but affiliated company, Super 18.

The aircraft fuselage is made from welded 4130 steel tubing, with the wing structure of aluminum sheet and all surfaces covered in  doped aircraft fabric. The wings are supported by "V" struts and jury struts. Dimensions and engines vary with specific model. Construction time for all models from the supplied kit is 900 hours.

Variants
Super 18-160-EXP
One reported completed by December 2011.
Super 18-180-EXP
Six reported completed by December 2011.
Super 18-LT-EXP
One reported completed by December 2011.

Specifications (Super 18-180-EXP)

References

External links

Homebuilt aircraft
Single-engined tractor aircraft